Whitman is an unincorporated community in northeastern Grant County, Nebraska, United States. It lies along Nebraska Highway 2, east of the village of Hyannis, the county seat of Grant County.  The University of Nebraska-Lincoln Gudmundsen Sandhills Laboratory lies just north of the community.  Although Whitman is unincorporated, it has a post office, with the ZIP code of 69366.

History
Whitman was established in the 1860s when the railroad was extended to that point. It was named after the town of Whitman, Massachusetts by a railroad official.

References

Unincorporated communities in Grant County, Nebraska
Unincorporated communities in Nebraska